Voltron Force is a pseudo-sequel to the 1980s animated series Voltron that was originally scheduled for a release in autumn of 2010. Eventually, the show premiered on June 16, 2011, exclusively on the Nicktoons television network to coincide with the premiere of the second season of Iron Man: Armored Adventures. It ended on April 25, 2012, with the episode "Black". Unlike the original Voltron series, the uniforms of the lions' pilots are of the same color scheme as their respective lions; the second Voltron series to do so after Voltron: The Third Dimension.

Premise
The series intro is narrated by Daniel (Vincent Tong):

The show centers on the reunion of the original Voltron Force and the group of cadets training to follow in their footsteps. In battle, they pilot their five robot lions and, when necessary, combine them to form the mighty robot Voltron. Among the enemies they face are their old nemesis, Lotor, and a corrupt military head intent on destroying Voltron and assassinating the Voltron Force to stage a coup d'état and become president of Galaxy Garrison himself.

Cast

 Mark Hildreth as King Lotor.
 Andrew Francis as Lance McClain.
 Ty Olsson as Hunk Garrett.
 Garry Chalk as Sky Marshall Wade, Manset.
 Shannon Chan-Kent as Larmina.
 Ashleigh Ball as Allura, Daigo.
 Sam Vincent as Pidge, King Alfor, Sypat, Dudley.
 Tabitha St. Germain as Kala.
 Giles Panton as Keith Kogane.
 Doron Bell Jr. as Vince.
 Vincent Tong as Daniel.
 Ron Halder as Maahox, Coran.
 Gabe Khouth as Chip (Pidge's brother).
 Alan Marriott as Sven Holgersson

Development and marketing
On March 11, 2010, at the Nickelodeon Upfront Presentation, a new Voltron series entitled Voltron Panthera Force was announced and set for premiere in the fall on Nicktoons with an announced premise that "The series follows the exploits of a group of five young cadets brought together under trying circumstances to form a newly appointed Voltron Lion Squad dubbed the "Panthera Force". Voltron Panthera Force is a World Wide Events production in conjunction with Kick Start Production." On April 4, 2010, it was announced that the show's title had been changed from Voltron Panthera Force to Voltron Force. On June 7, 2010, Variety announced WEP Productions, Classic Media and Kickstart Entertainment's plans to air a 26 episode season of Voltron Force in 2011 to coincide with the 25th anniversary of the original series as well as Mattel's plans to release a toyline to tie-in with the 25th anniversary of the original series and the launch of the new series. In March 2011, it was announced that Emmy-nominated composer Hal Beckett and Gemini-nominated composer Steffan Andrews, would score the show.

The Voltron Force logo and storyboards have been revealed on the official Facebook profile for the show, which is run by World Events Productions. WEP and video game publisher THQ has announced a partnership to produce video games based on the classic Voltron series and Voltron Force in 2011 and 2012 respectively; However, only the game based on the classic series was released on Xbox Live Arcade and PlayStation Network in November 2011. Following the closure of THQ and its subsidiaries, the future and rights of the Voltron video games remain in question.

Cancellation
At the end of "Black", Daniel still has Haggarium in him and was shown briefly attacking the other members of the Voltron force in the black lion. There was supposed to be a second season which was briefly in the works, but due to complications with budget funding for the second season, it was never made and the show was canceled, ending it on a cliffhanger.

Episodes

References

External links
 Nicktoons Voltron Force site – Archive Link from Wayback Machine.
 .
 .
 .
 .

Nicktoons (TV network) original programming
 
2011 American television series debuts
2012 American television series endings
2010s American animated television series
2010s American science fiction television series
2011 Canadian television series debuts
2012 Canadian television series endings
2010s Canadian animated television series
2010s Canadian science fiction television series
American children's animated action television series
American children's animated space adventure television series
American children's animated science fantasy television series
Canadian children's animated action television series
Canadian children's animated space adventure television series
Canadian children's animated science fantasy television series
American sequel television series
Anime-influenced Western animated television series
Television series by Universal Television
Television series set on fictional planets
English-language television shows